Alachino is a rural locality (a selo) in Novoselskoye Rural Settlement, Kovrovsky District, Vladimir Oblast, Russia. The population was 7 as of 2010. There are 3 streets.

Geography 
Alachino is located 60 km southwest of Kovrov (the district's administrative centre) by road. Dmitriyevo is the nearest rural locality.

References 

Rural localities in Kovrovsky District